Sticker hårt is the debut studio album by Swedish-Finnish singer Markoolio, released on 22 October 1998.

Track listing
Intro - 2:36
Markoolio é mé - 3:48
Vi drar till fjällen - 3:46
Raggningstips 1 - 0:31
Drömmen om Finland - 3:32
Åka pendeltåg - 2:49
Raggningstips 2 - 3:11
Sommar och sol - 3:04
Party på ett skitigt hotell - 3:04
Bira låten - 3:52
Raggningstips 3 - 0:37
Allan Ballan - 3:32
Rashan ringde - 3:19
Raggningstips 4 - 0:39
Den 24:e december - 7:27

Charts

References 

1998 debut albums
Markoolio albums
Swedish-language albums